Lights of London is a 1923 British silent drama film directed by Charles Calvert and starring Wanda Hawley, Nigel Barrie and Warburton Gamble. The film is based on the 1881 stage melodrama The Lights o' London by George Sims and was made at the Lime Grove Studios.

Cast
 Wanda Hawley as Bess Marks 
 Nigel Barrie as Harold Armytage 
 Warburton Gamble as Clifford Armytage 
 James Lindsay as Seth Preene 
 Mary Clare as Hetty Preene 
 Cecil Morton York as Sir Oliver Armytage 
 Dorothy Fane as Belle 
 A. Harding Steerman as Bertram Marks 
 H.R. Hignett as Simon Jarvis 
 Mary Brough as Mrs. Jarvis

References

Bibliography
 Low, Rachael. History of the British Film, 1918-1929. George Allen & Unwin, 1971.

External links

1923 films
1923 drama films
British drama films
Films directed by Charles Calvert
British silent feature films
British films based on plays
Films set in London
Films shot at Lime Grove Studios
British black-and-white films
1920s English-language films
1920s British films
Silent drama films